50 Biscayne is a fifty-seven story skyscraper condo in the Central Business District of Downtown Miami, Florida, United States. As its name implies, the tower is located at the address of 50 Biscayne Boulevard in between Flagler and Northeast 1st Streets. The size and stature of 50 Biscayne conceives a significant part of the Biscayne Wall, which is a series of buildings and parks stretching along the Biscayne Bay.

The tower's main lobby consists of three stories, followed by the Park Suites, which are condos customly furnished by the Rockwell Group, on floors 4 through 9. The two-story tenth and twelfth floors contain hotel-esque amenities available to the tower's residents. Ascending floors contain all condos.

The tower's architecture is based on the Miami Modern (abbreviated as MiMo) style, and has many design features that pay tribute to landscape architect Roberto Burle Marx's emphasis on natural aesthetics seen along the bay. The site where 50 Biscayne stands today was formerly home to the Columbus Bazaar, a shopping mall which replaced The Hotel McAllister and the Columbus Hotel in a quick fix effort to reutilize the land when both establishments closed for business. The McAllister Hotel was considered one of the city's earliest high-rises when constructed in 1917, while the taller Columbus Hotel sported a top story restaurant (called Top O' The Columbus) and retail arcade.

Gallery

See also
List of tallest buildings in Miami
 List of tallest buildings in Florida

External links
Emporis - 50 Biscayne

Residential buildings completed in 2007
Residential condominiums in Miami
Residential skyscrapers in Miami
2007 establishments in Florida